Geoff Clark or Geoffrey Clark may refer to:

 Geoff Clark (politician) (born 1952), Australian Aboriginal politician and activist
 Geoff Clark (rugby league) (1920–2008), English rugby league footballer
 Geoffrey Clark (water polo) (born 1969), Australian water polo player
 Geoffrey James Clark (born 1981), American film and television producer

See also
Jeff Clark (disambiguation)
Jeff Clarke (disambiguation)